Sir Philip Hubert Martineau (28 October 1862 – 7 October 1944) was an English solicitor who became President of the Law Society. He was also a cricketer who played for Marylebone Cricket Club (MCC) as a left-arm fast-medium bowler.

Biography
Born in London in 1862,  Martineau was educated at Harrow School and played for the cricket team there in 1880 and 1881. He was a student at Trinity College, Cambridge, graduating BA in 1884. He became a solicitor and was elected president of the Law Society in 1931-32 and knighted in the 1933 New Year Honours.

Cricket career
He made his first-class debut in 1883 for the MCC against Derbyshire.

Following a minor match against Northumberland in July of that year, he played his second and final first-class match for the MCC against Somerset.

He died in Sunningdale in 1944, survived by his son Hubert, who also played first-class cricket. Two cousins, Alfred and Lionel also played first-class cricket.

References

1862 births
1944 deaths
People from St Pancras, London
Cricketers from Greater London
People educated at Harrow School
English solicitors
Presidents of the Law Society of England and Wales
English cricketers
Marylebone Cricket Club cricketers
Berkshire cricketers